The Albatros L 57 was an early monoplane. It was a project for an airliner but was never completed, and as such never entered production. The top covering of the fuselage is swept up higher as compared to other similar planes of the era. The plane was designed to have up to six passengers.

Specifications 
 Engine: Mercedes D.IIIa
 Length: 10.42 meters
 Height: 3.55 meters
 Span: 14.20 meters
 Wing Area: 34.50 meters2
 Weights: Empty: 1036 kilograms; Flying Weight: 1850 kilograms
 Max. speed at sea level: 149 km/h
 Cruising Speed at Sea Level: 120 km/h
 Ceiling: 3450 meters
 Range on full tank: 540 km

References 

High-wing aircraft
L 57
Single-engined tractor aircraft